Baruch ben Jehuda Löb Lindau (1759, Hanover, Holy Roman Empire — 5 December 1849, Berlin, Prussia) was a Jewish-German mathematician, science writer, and translator.

Lindau became a member of the circle of the maskilim in Berlin, publishing a series of articles on science and scientific instruments in ha-Me'assef. He was a counselor of the maskilic association Chevrat shocharai Ha'tov ve'hatushiya and contributed translations of several haftarot to German for Mendelssohn's Bi'ur project.

In 1789, he published his most successful work: , a Hebrew scientific textbook containing sections on astronomy, physics, biology, and geography. The second part of Reshit Limmudim was published in 1810, devoted to physics, chemistry, and mechanics. The work remained a popular scientific encyclopedia among European Jews for nearly a century.

References

 

1759 births
1849 deaths
Jewish scientists
18th-century German mathematicians
18th-century German Jews
Hebrew–German translators
19th-century German mathematicians